= Winger (sports) =

Sports position

In certain sports, such as football, field hockey, ice hockey, handball, rugby union, lacrosse and rugby league, winger is a position. It refers to positions on the extreme left and right sides of the pitch, or playing field (the "wings"). In American football and Canadian football, the analogous position is the wide receiver. Wingers often try to use pace to exploit extra space available on the flanks that can be made available by their teammates dominating the centre ground. They must be wary however of not crossing the touchline, or sidelines, and going out of play. In sports where the main method of scoring involves attacking a small goal (by whatever name) in the centre of the field, a common tactic is to cross the ball to a central teammate.

== Association football ==
In football, a winger is an attacking midfielder in a wide position. Wingers are usually players of great pace or dribbling ability so as to provide cut-backs or crosses from which strikers can score. Their main function is to support attack from the wings. Wingers do much high-speed running from defence to attack.

== Australian rules football ==
In Australian rules football, the wingers require considerable pace and stamina, as they run up and down the ground linking play between defence and attack and are normally highly skilled in kicking.

== Ice hockey ==
"Winger", in ice hockey, is a forward position of a player whose primary zone of play on the ice is along the outer playing area. They typically work by flanking the centre forward. Originally the name was given to forward players who went up and down the sides of the rink. Nowadays, there are different types of wing men in the game—out-and-out goal scorers, checkers who disrupt the opponents and forwards who work along the boards and in the corners. This position is typically just called "wing", often preceded by the side on which the player normally skates (left wing or right wing).

== Handball ==
In handball there are two wing positions: left wing and right wing. In a typical team, these positions are occupied by fast and relatively small players. One of their main jobs in a game are fast attacks.

== Rugby football ==
Wingers or wings play on either the extreme left or the extreme right. They are usually the fastest players on the field and score the most tries. Wingers often fall back with the fullback to take kicks from the opposition.

There are two wings in a rugby league team, numbered 2 and 5. There are two wings in a rugby union team, numbered 11 and 14.

== See also ==
- Association football positions
- Rugby league positions
- Rugby union positions
